Robert Collins is an Australian actor and singer. His best known roles include Waruu West in  Cleverman, Jack Winters in The Wrong Girl,  and Charlie Irving in Total Control.

Early life and education
Robert Collins was born and raised in Darwin, Northern Territory from a Tiwi Islands background. He worked with the National Indigenous Music Awards, and was the national Indigenous representative for the Australasian Performing Right Association (APRA) for three years.

He then looked for acting opportunities, and landed the roles of Theseus and Oberon in a local production of A Midsummer Night’s Dream, before being cast in more national and local productions. He auditioned and won a place at the National Institute of Dramatic Art, graduating in 2013.

Professional acting career
He made his professional stage debut in 2013 as Mufasa in the Australian production of The Lion King.

Collins is best known for his major roles in the Australian television series Cleverman and The Wrong Girl, both of which premiered in 2016.

He played Lysander in A Midsummer Night's Dream at the Sydney Theatre Company in September and October 2016, directed by Kip Williams.

In 2017, he played Phil Holden in the Australian television program Glitch.

Filmography

Film

Television

Stage

References

External links 
 

Living people
1979 births
21st-century Australian male actors
Australian male film actors
Australian male stage actors
Australian male television actors
Indigenous Australian male actors
Logie Award winners
People from Darwin, Northern Territory